Sweden was the host country of the inaugural Winter Paralympic Games in 1976, in Örnsköldsvik. The country was represented by 16 athletes (9 men and 7 women). This was only the sixth largest delegation, despite Sweden being the host nation. Swedes competed exclusively in cross-country skiing; the host country was thus unrepresented in alpine skiing.

Sweden won a total of twenty medals (of which six were gold, seven silver and seven bronze), placing it fifth on the medal table.

Sweden's gold medallists at the Örnsköldsvik Games were:
 the women's 3×5 km relay team (categories A-B): Karin Gustavsson, Astril Nilsson and Birgitta Sund
 Karin Gustavsson in the women's 5 km (B)
 Birgitta Sund in the women's 5 km and 10 km (A)
 Bertil Lundmark in the men's 5 km and 10 km (II)

See also
Sweden at the 1976 Winter Olympics
Sweden at the 1976 Summer Paralympics

References

1976
Nations at the 1976 Winter Paralympics
Winter Paralympics